"Joy" is a song by British house music studio project Staxx, assembled by producers Simon Thorne and Tom Jones. It was released in 1993 as a single only and features singer Carol Leeming, becoming a number-one hit on both the Billboard Hot Dance Club Play chart and the Canadian RPM Dance/Urban chart. On the UK Singles Chart, it peaked at number 25. Its music video was directed by Lindy Heymann.

Chart performance
"Joy" was a club staple and a notable hit on the charts in several countries, peaking at number-one on both the Billboard Hot Dance Club Play chart in the US (in February 1994) and the RPM Dance/Urban chart in Canada (in May 1994). In Europe, it was a top 20 hit in Denmark (20), and a top 30 hit in Switzerland (30) and the UK. In the latter, it peaked at number 25 in its third week at the UK Singles Chart, on October 10, 1993. On the UK Dance Singles Chart, it hit number two. In the Netherlands, "Joy" was a top 40 hit, reaching number 33. On the Eurochart Hot 100, it reached its highest position as number 70, while on the European Dance Radio Chart, it peaked at number six. In Australia, it reached number 90.

In 1997, the song was released in a new remix, this time reaching number 14 on the UK Singles Chart, number five on the UK Dance Singles Chart and number two on the UK Club Chart.

Critical reception
Larry Flick from Billboard wrote that "this smokin' anthem is cast in a mold similar to Culture Beat's "Mr. Vain", wrapping a brain-embedding hook around a rapid, percolating beatbase. [...] Icing on the cake is Carol Leeming's spirited vocal appearance on several mixes." In the magazine's single review, he also noted that it "has a roaring and frenetic rave-ish undercurrent", complimenting the singer as "a charming presence, playfully wrapping her feline voice around the song's ear-catching chorus and refrain." Maria Jimenez from Music & Media stated that the track "is spreading like musical wildfire." James Hamilton from Music Week'''s RM Dance Update described it as a "typically excellent Carol Leeming wailed and scatted catchy soul-funk-gospel-garage-house with so many "joy"-ful influences that it's instantly familiar". Wendi Cermak from The Network Forty deemed it a "delectable dance tune to liven up your current library of down-tempo jams and ballads." David Petrilla from The Weekender concluded that "this song deserves all the attention it will get. It's upbeat, happy, well produced and performed. 'Joy' has what it takes to enjoy a long stay in most DJs play stacks. I wouldn't be surprised if it even crosses over to radio, but remember you heard it first on the dance floor!"

On the 1997 remix, Flick from Billboard declared it as a "cute Euro-NRG ditty" and a "wonderfully bright and anthemic jam". He added, "Leeming has a sassy vocal style to offset the oh-so-happy music. She knocks off a few festive vamps and refrains that should stick to the brains of programmers within seconds." Chris Finan from Music Weeks RM Dance Update gave it four out of five, commenting, "Far and away a cracking record in its own right, Champion relives the moment with some deft reworkings by Grand Larceny and Monde. The best way to update this would have been to stick closely to all the hooks that made it the first time and that's exactly what's been done. Mondo just updates the tune, retaining the complete Carol Leeming vocal and using similar synth hooks over the top. An old favourite that will probably become a new favourite."

Music video
A music video was produced to promote the single, directed by British director Lindy Heymann. It features singer Carol Leeming and two dancers performing in an empty swimming pool. The video was later published on YouTube in July 2009.

Track listing

 12", UK (1993)A. "Joy" (Love Joy Vocal Mix)
B1. "Joy" (Original Mix)
B2. "Joy" (Love Joy Stringapella)

 12" (Diss-Cuss Remix), Italy (1993)A1. "Joy" (Diss-Cuss Vox Remix) – 6:40
A2. "Joy" (Joy Radio Edit) – 3:38
B1. "Joy" (Original Mix) – 5:52
B2. "Joy" (Love Joy 12" Vocal Mix) – 6:20

 CD single, UK (1993)"Joy" (Love Joy Serious Vocal Edit) – 3:37
"Joy" (Original Edit) – 3:21
"Joy" (Love Joy Vocal Mix) – 6:24
"Joy" (Original Mix) – 6:37
"Joy" (Diss-Cuss Vox Mix) – 6:40
"Joy" (Stones Club Mix) – 4:55
"Joy" (Love Joy Dub) – 6:53

 CD maxi, Germany (1993)"Joy" (Love Joy Serious Vocal Edit) – 3:40
"Joy" (Original Radio Edit) – 3:22
"Joy" (Love Joy Serious Vocal Mix) – 6:25
"Joy" (Stones Club Mix) – 4:53

 12", UK (1997)A. "Joy" (Mondo's Pussycat Vocal)
B1. "Joy" (Lovejoy Vocal 12")
B2. "Joy" (Grand Larceny Mix)

 CD single, UK (1997)'''
"Joy" (Mondo's Pussycat Radio Edit) – 3:49
"Joy" (Lovejoy Vocal Edit) – 3:38
"Joy" (Mondo's Pussycat Vocal 12") – 7:34
"Joy" (Lovejoy Vocal 12") – 6:25
"Joy" (Mondo's Topless Vocal 12") – 6:58
"Joy" (Grand Larceny Mix) – 8:23

Charts

Weekly charts

Year-end charts

See also
List of number-one dance hits (United States)
List of artists who reached number one on the U.S. Dance Club Songs chart

References

1993 debut singles
1997 singles
1993 songs
Champion Records singles
Music videos directed by Lindy Heymann
Staxx songs